Michael William ffolliott Aldridge (9 September 1920 – 10 January 1994) was an English actor. He was known for playing Seymour Utterthwaite in the television series Last of the Summer Wine from 1986 to 1990 and he had a long career as a character actor on stage and screen dating back to the 1930s.

Early life
The son of Dr Frederick James Aldridge and his wife Kathleen Michaela Marietta White, Aldridge was born in Glastonbury, Somerset, England, on 9 September 1920. He was educated at Gresham's School, Holt, Norfolk, where he acted in school plays. In his last year at school he played the title role in a production of Othello, a report in The Times noting "M. W. ff. Aldridge (aged 17½ years) was masterly and dignified as Othello and well worthy of the formal designation 'a noble Moor'".

Career
He started his acting career in August 1939 at the Palace Theatre, Watford appearing in Terence Rattigan's play French Without Tears. A few days later, World War II broke out. From 1939 to 1940, he was in rep at Bristol, Blackpool, Sunderland, Sheffield, Bradford and Amersham. In 1940, he joined the Royal Air Force and served in Africa, the United States, the Middle East and the Mediterranean, leaving the service in 1945 as a Flight Lieutenant.

After the war, Aldridge returned to acting, and toured with the Arts Council Midland Theatre Company from 1946 to 1948, but it was not until 1954 that his career started to gain him recognition, when he took a role in Salad Days at the Vaudeville Theatre, where he remained until 1957. He played many roles in musicals throughout his career, usually in supporting roles in which he was highly reliable and professional.

Theatre
Aldridge's first professional appearance was in the part of Kenneth in French without Tears, at the Palace Theatre, Watford, in August 1939. He was in rep until 1940. His first West End appearance was in This Way to the Tomb, playing the Prologue and the Mechanic, at the Garrick Theatre, 1946; toured with the Arts Council Midland Theatre Company from November 1946 to July 1948; appeared in Nottingham Theatre Trust productions from November 1948 to March 1949, playing Othello in Othello at Nottingham, 1948, and at the Embassy Theatre, 1949; with Birmingham rep, 1949; Old Vic Company at New Theatre, 1949-1950: Love's Labour's Lost, She Stoops to Conquer, The Miser, Hamlet; returned to Arts Council Midland Theatre Company, 1950; Bristol Old Vic, 1951-1952: played Macbeth in Macbeth, Two Gentlemen of Verona, Of Mice and Men; Escapade, at St James's Theatre, Strand, London, 1953–1954; Salad Days, Vaudeville Theatre, 1954; Free as Air, Savoy Theatre, 1957; Moon for the Misbegotten, Arts Theatre, 1960; Vanity Fair, Queen's Theatre, 1962; The Fighting Cock, Duke of York's Theatre, 1966; at Chichester Festival, 1966–1969, and 1971–1972. Heartbreak House, Lyric Theatre, 1967; The Cocktail Party, Wyndham's Theatre, Haymarket, 1968; The Magistrate, Cambridge, 1969; A Bequest to the Nation, Haymarket, 1970; Reunion in Vienna, Piccadilly, 1972; Absurd Person Singular, Criterion Theatre, 1973; The Tempest, Royal Shakespeare Company at The Other Place, 1974; Jeeves, Her Majesty's Theatre, 1975; Lies, Albery Theatre, 1975; The Bed before Yesterday, Lyric Theatre, 1976; Rosmersholm, Haymarket, 1977;The Old Country, Queen's Theatre, 1978; Bedroom Farce, National Theatre at The Prince of Wales, 1978; The Last of Mrs Cheyney, Cambridge, 1980; Noises Off, Lyric, Hammersmith and Savoy, 1982; The Biko Inquest, Riverside, 1984; Relatively Speaking, Greenwich, 1986.

Television
On television, an early significant role was as criminologist Ian Dimmock in the Granada TV series The Man in Room 17 and its sequel The Fellows (1965–67). His screen work included playing Pistol in Orson Welles' movie Chimes at Midnight in 1967.

In 1975 Aldridge appeared in the title role of Andrew Lloyd Webber and Alan Ayckbourn's musical Jeeves, based on the stories by P. G. Wodehouse. The show was a rare flop for Webber, and the negative critical reaction led to Aldridge giving up his stage career to concentrate on television and film roles.

He played the part of Rollo in the 1977 serial Love for Lydia, produced by London Weekend Television.

He played Percy Alleline in Tinker, Tailor, Soldier, Spy on BBC TV in 1979, Sir Basil in the 6th episode “Neck” of 1st series of Anglia Television’s Tales of the Unexpected first aired on ITV in the same year and appeared in the sitcom Yes, Prime Minister.

In 1980 he played the role of Matthew Radlett, Lord Alconleigh, in the TV miniseries Love in a Cold Climate - Simon Raven's adaptation of the Nancy Mitford novels Love in a Cold Climate and the Pursuit of Love for Thames Television.

Between 1986 and 1990, he starred as Seymour Utterthwaite in Last of the Summer Wine. The character was an ex-headmaster and inventor, designed to replace the Foggy Dewhurst character played by Brian Wilde, who had left the series. However, Aldridge wanted to retire to nurse his sick wife, and this coincided with Wilde deciding to return to the show, so Aldridge's character was written out.

One of his most memorable later roles was as the elderly professor Digory Kirke in the television version of The Lion, the Witch, and the Wardrobe (1988).

When Aldridge died in 1994, his obituary in The Times said of him:

Private life
Aldridge married Kirsteen Rowntree, and they had three daughters: Charlotte L. Aldridge (born 1948), Harriet K. Aldridge (born 1952) and Emma R. Aldridge (born 1954). He stated his main interests as sailing, market gardening, watching cricket and playing tennis, and also liked to make his own bread and jam.
At the time of his death, he was living in Greenwich, London. He left his role in Last of the Summer Wine to be a full-time carer for his wife.

Selected filmography
Nothing Venture (1948) - Michael Garrod
Murder in the Cathedral (1951) - Second Knight
Life for Ruth (1962) - Dr. Richard Harvard
Chimes at Midnight (1965) - Pistol
Follow Me! (1972) - Sir Philip Crouch
Tinker Tailor Soldier Spy (1979) - Percy Alleline
Reilly, Ace of Spies (1983) - Orlov
Bullshot (1983) - Prof. Rupert Fenton
A Voyage Round My Father (1984) (TV) - Headmaster
Hallelujah! (1983–1984) (TV)
Charters and Caldicott (1985) (TV) - Caldicott
Turtle Diary (1985) - Mr. Meager, Bookstore Owner
Mussolini: The Untold Story (1985) - Matteotti
Yes Prime Minister (1986) (TV) - Geoffrey - Director General MI5
Clockwise (1986) - Prior
Shanghai Surprise (1986) - Mr. Burns
Murder by the Book (1986) - Edmond Cork
The Lion, the Witch, & the Wardrobe (1988) - Professor Digory Kirke
Countdown to War (1989) - Neville Chamberlain
Inspector Morse episode - The Last Enemy (1989) - Arthur Drysdale
Last of the Summer Wine (1986–1990) (TV) - Seymour
Stanley and the Women (1991) (TV) - Dr. Alfred Nash

References
Notes

Bibliography
Who's Who 1993 (A. & C. Black, London, 1993) page 19

External links
 
 Stout-hearted Men
 icHuddersfield Obituary

1920 births
1994 deaths
English male film actors
English male stage actors
English male television actors
People educated at Gresham's School
People from Glastonbury
Royal Air Force officers
Royal Air Force personnel of World War II
20th-century English male actors
British male comedy actors